The 1914 Primera División was the third season of top-flight Peruvian football. A total of 8 teams competed in the league, The champion was Lima Cricket.

League table

Standings

Title

External links
Peruvian Championship 
Peruvian Football League News 
La Liga Peruana de Football 

Peru
1914
1914 in Peruvian football